Kandy Crusaders cricket team is one of the five provincial cricket teams which make up the Sri Lankan domestic cricket structure representing mainly three districts of Central Province, Sri Lanka, and with some nearby provinces. In previous occasions, the province was included in to Kandurata Maroons, where part of them was combined in this season as Kandy Crusaders. The cricket team's first participation came during the Twenty20 competition known as the Inter-Provincial Twenty20 2016 season which was known as Super T20 Provincial Tournament.

The team plays their matches in Colombo R. Premadasa Stadium, though the home ground is Pallekele International Cricket Stadium. Lahiru Thirimanne is the captain of the side. Dilhara Fernando, Thisara Perera, Suranga Lakmal and Sachithra Senanayake are some of the other notable current Test cricketers and Limited overs cricketers in the national side.

Current squad
The squad for the 2015–16 season as of 26 January 2016.

||  || Lahiru Thirimanne (c) ||  26 ||  Batsman ||  LHB ||  LMF
|-
||  || Lasith Ambuldeniya ||   ||  Bowler ||  LHB ||  LO
|-
||  || Minod Bhanuka ||  20 ||  Opening Batsman ||  LHB ||  
|-
||  || Akila Dananjaya ||  22 ||  Bowler ||  LHB ||  ROB
|-
||  || Dilhara Fernando ||  36 ||  Bowler ||  RHB ||  RF
|-
||  || Anuk Fernando ||  20 ||  All-rounder ||  LHB ||  RMF
|-
||  || Danushka Gunathilaka ||  24 ||  All-rounder ||  LHB ||  RMF
|-
||  || Saliya Saman ||  30 ||  All-rounder ||  RHB ||  RMF
|-
||  || Suranga Lakmal ||  28 ||  Bowler ||  RHB ||  RMF
|-
||  || Jeevan Mendis ||  33 ||  All-rounder ||  LHB ||  LB
|-
||  || Angelo Perera ||  25 ||  All-rounder ||  RHB ||  LO
|-
||  || Thisara Perera ||  26 ||  All-rounder ||  LHB ||  RMF
|-
||  || Chathura Randunu ||  31 ||  All-rounder ||  LHB ||  LO
|-
||  || Manoj Sarathchandra ||  22 ||  Wicket-keeper ||  RHB ||  
|-
||  || Sachithra Senanayake ||  30 ||  All-rounder ||  RHB ||  ROB
|}
|}

References

Provincial Twenty20 teams
Sport in Kandy
Cricket clubs established in 2016
Sports clubs in Sri Lanka
Cricket in Kandy